Trouble with Trixie is a 1972 West German comedy film directed by Franz Josef Gottlieb and starring Uschi Glas, Peter Weck, and Fritz Eckhardt. A young woman is sent by an American company as a spy on a German toy manufacturer.

Cast

References

Bibliography

External links 
 

1972 films
1972 comedy films
German comedy films
West German films
1970s German-language films
Films directed by Franz Josef Gottlieb
Films scored by Gerhard Heinz
Terra Film films
1970s German films